Atherton is a toponymic surname. One origin is the town of Atherton, historically in Lancashire, England.

Notable individuals

A 
 Adelbert S. Atherton, American politician 
 Alfred Atherton, former U.S. Ambassador
 Alfred Bennison Atherton, Canadian physician
 Alice Atherton, 19th century theatrical performer
 Amber Atherton, British entrepreneur
 Andrew Atherton, former principal and vice-chancellor of the University of Dundee
 Andrew Atherton (gymnast), British gymnast
 Arlon S. Atherton, US Civil War veteran and politician
 Artie Atherton, showman

B 
 Billy Atherton, English footballer
 Brenda Atherton, England international lawn and indoor bowler

C 
 Candy Atherton, British journalist and politician
 Cassandra Atherton, Australian prose-poet, critic, and scholar
  Charles Atherton, British inventor and Civil Engineer
 Charles G. Atherton, U.S. Representative and Senator from New Hampshire
 Charles Henry Atherton, American architect and secretary of the U.S. Commission of Fine Arts
 Charles Humphrey Atherton, U.S. Representative from New Hampshire
 Charlie Atherton, American baseball player
 Claire Atherton, Franco-American film editor
 Cornelius Atherton, American steelmaker

D 
 Dan Atherton, British racing cyclist
 David Atherton, British conductor and co-founder of the London Sinfonietta
 David Atherton (baker), English baker and health advisor
 David Atherton, British guitarist and mentor of The Wild Flowers
 Donny Atherton, American BMX racer

E 
 Edwin Atherton, FBI agent and private investigator
 Effie Atherton, British actress
 Eleanora Atherton, English philanthropist
 Ella Atherton, Scottish actress
 Ella Blaylock Atherton, British-born American physician
 Lizzie Aiken née Atherton, US Civil War nurse
 Elizabeth Atherton, British lyric soprano
 Elizabeth Potts née Atherton, only woman to be legally executed in the U.S. state of Nevada
 Ernest Atherton, Australian state level politician

F 
 Faxon Atherton, American businessman
 Frank Atherton, British physician and Chief Medical Officer for Wales
 Frederick Atherton, American politician and writer

G 
 G. F. A. Atherton, American politician
 Gee Atherton and Rachel Atherton, mountain bike racers
 George W. Atherton, president of the Pennsylvania State University
 Gertrude Atherton, American writer
 Gibson Atherton, U.S. Representative from Ohio
 Gordon Atherton, English footballer

H 
 Henry B. Atherton, US Civil War veteran, and lawyer
 Henry L. Atherton, American businessman and diplomat
 Henry F. Atherton, American businessman
 Henry Valpey Atherton, American lawyer, part of the Nuremberg Trials
 Henry Vernon Atherton, American professor and pioneer in the dairy industry
 Hope Atherton, colonial clergyman of the 17th century
 Horace H. Atherton, Massachusetts politician 
 Howard Atherton, British cinematographer
 Major General Humphrey Atherton, early settler of Massachusetts Bay Colony

J 
 Jack Atherton, English footballer
 James Atherton (early settler to Massachusetts), early settler in New England
 James Atherton (photographer), news photographer in Washington D.C.
 James Atherton, English actor
 James Atherton (footballer, born 1872), English footballer
 James Atherton (footballer, born 1875) who played for Preston North End
 James Atherton (tenor) (born 1943), American tenor
 Jason Atherton, English chef
 Jeptha Atherton, North Carolina landowner, politician, and American Revolutionary War soldier
 Jim Atherton, Welsh footballer
 John Atherton (died 1573), English politician
 John Atherton, Anglican Bishop of Waterford and Lismore in the Church of Ireland
 John Atherton (died 1617), English politician
 John Atherton (pioneer), namesake of the Atherton Tablelands
 John Carlton Atherton, American artist born in Brainerd, Minnesota
 John McDougal Atherton, American distiller
 John W. Atherton, American writer and academic
 Joseph Ballard Atherton, American businessman and philanthropist in the 19th century
 Joshua Atherton, early anti-slavery campaigner in Massachusetts
 Julie Atherton, British actress

K 
 Keith Atherton, American baseball player
 Kevin Atherton, Manx artist

L 
 Lewis Eldon Atherton, American academic and author

M 
 Margaret Atherton, American philosopher and feminist historian
 Mike Atherton OBE, former player and captain of the English cricket team
 Michael Atherton (musician), Australian musician and composer
 Minna Atherton, Australian competitive swimmer

N 
 Nancy Atherton, American author
 Nicholas Atherton, English politician, MP for Lancashire
 Nigel Atherton, magazine editor
 Noel Atherton, British cartographer

P 
 Paul Atherton, British television producer
 Paula Atherton, American saxophonist
 Percy Lee Atherton, American composer 
  Peter Atherton, a Massachusetts colonial leader
 Peter Atherton (footballer), English footballer
 Peter Atherton (manufacturer), British designer of instruments, inventor, and manufacturer of textile machinery
 Peter Lee Atherton, American businessman, property developer, investor, and politician
 Phil Atherton, English curler

R 
 Rachel Atherton, British racing cyclist; sister of Dan Atherton and Gee Atherton
 Ray Atherton, U.S. Diplomat who served as the first United States Ambassador to Canada (1943–48)
 Ralph Atherton
 Richard Atherton, Member of Parliament for Liverpool
 Ro Atherton, Royal Air Force officer
 Robert Atherton, English poet from Lancashire
 Robert C. Atherton, magazine editor 
 Robert "Bobby" Atherton, Welsh footballer who died in the First World War
 Robert Atherton Edwin, New Zealand meteorologist and weather forecaster

S 
 Samuel Atherton, U.S. politician from Massachusetts
 Sarah Atherton, British Conservative Member of Parliament (MP) for Wrexham
 Simon Atherton, 19th-century Shaker
 Sonia Wieder-Atherton, Franco-American classical cellist
 Steve Atherton, former South African rugby union player

T 
 Tammy Ealom (Tamaira Jane Atherton), guitarist, vocalist, and principal songwriter for the indie rock band Dressy Bessy
 Ted Atherton, Canadian actor
 Terence Atherton, British intelligence officer
 Thomas H. Atherton, American architect
 Tommy Atherton, English footballer
 Thomas Powys, 3rd Baron Lilford, British peer and Whig politician
 Tim Atherton, Australian baseball player
 Tony Atherton, American saxophonist and member of Bazooka (band)

V 
 Viopapa Annandale-Atherton, Samoan doctor

W 
 Walter Atherton (architect), American architect
 Walter Atherton (footballer), English footballer
 Warren Atherton, father of the G.I. Bill (Servicemen's Readjustment Act of 1944)
 William Atherton (minister), Wesleyan minister
 Sir William Atherton (politician), Scottish barrister and Liberal Party politician
 William Atherton, American actor
 William Atherton (mayor of Preston)
 William Atherton (plantation owner)
 William H. Atherton
 William Atherton (soldier)

People with "Atherton" as a middle name 

 Aline Atherton-Smith
 Bruce Atherton Smith
 Caroline Atherton Mason
  Charles Atherton Brown
 Ebenezer Atherton Hunt
 Florence Atherton Spalding
 George Atherton Aitken
 Henry Atherton Frost
  Horace Atherton Jackson
 James Atherton Tilden
 Jesse Atherton Bynum
 Joseph Atherton Gilman
 Paul A. Kennon
 Robert Atherton Edwin
 Robert Atherton Rawstorne
 Robert Vernon Atherton Gwillym
 Thomas Atherton Powys
 Uriah Atherton Boyden
 Walter Hussey

Fictional characters 
 Bill Atherton in 1978 film Damien: Omen II
 Geoffrey Atherton in American TV series Mad Men, Season 4, Episode 12 "Blowing Smoke"
 Dr James Atherton in 1990 film Arachnophobia
 Lucia Atherton in 1974 film The Night Porter

See also 
 
 Atherton (disambiguation)

References

Further reading

External links 

Atherton families global international study
 Atherton at the Guild of One-Name Studies

English-language surnames
English toponymic surnames